Warangal Division was administratively part of the Hyderabad State was made up of sixteen districts. Warangal was one of four divisions in the state.

Districts

 Adilabad
 Karimnagar
 Warangal (present Khammam district was part of Warangal district).

References

Hyderabad State